John Martin M.D. (1789–1869) was a British meteorologist and physician, known now for his writing on Tonga.

Life
Martin practised for some years as a physician in the City of London, and died at Lisbon on 8 July 1869.

Works
The Athenæum reported on Martin's meteorological investigations. For pressure, temperature, and moisture, he made meteorological charts from daily observations. He noted ozone, as well as factors thought to affect cholera and yellow fever.

Martin edited an account of Tonga from William Mariner. It appeared as An Account of the Natives of the Tonga Islands, in the South Pacific Ocean, with an original Grammar and Vocabulary of their Language. Compiled and arranged from the extensive communications of Mr. William Mariner, several years resident in those Islands,''' 2 vols. London, 1817; 2nd edit. 1818. It was also reprinted as vol. xiii. of Constable's Miscellany''; a French translation appeared at Paris in November 1817. Mariner had been detained in Tonga from 1806 to 1810.

Notes

Attribution

1789 births
1869 deaths
19th-century English medical doctors
British meteorologists
British writers